Cezmi Baskın (born 11 March 1949) is a Turkish actor. He has appeared in more than sixty films since the 1970s.

Selected filmography

References

External links 

1949 births
Living people
Turkish male film actors
Male actors from Istanbul